Mark Spencer (born April 8, 1977) is an American computer engineer and is the original author of the GTK+-based instant messaging client Gaim (which has since been renamed to Pidgin), the L2TP daemon l2tpd and the Cheops Network User Interface.

Mark Spencer is also the creator of Asterisk, a Linux-based open-sourced PBX. He is the founder, chairman and CTO of Digium, an open-source telecommunications supplier most notable for its development and sponsorship of Asterisk. Spencer shifted from CEO to Chairman and CTO in early 2007.

Early life 
Spencer was born and raised in Auburn, Alabama. He attended Auburn University where both his parents were professors. In high school, he was mentored by another Auburn professor, Thaddeus Roppel, and Mark Smith, co-founder of Adtran.

Career 
While attending Auburn University, Spencer co-oped at Adtran when he wrote l2tpd. He went on to start a Linux technical support business. Spencer did not have enough money to buy a PBX (private branch exchange) for his company so he decided to write Asterisk and later founded Digium.

As a pilot, Mark founded Avilution, LLC. to create Android apps including QuickWeather and AviationMaps. AviationMaps was later spun out to FlightPro, then DroidEFB. Adapting a similar strategy as Asterisk, he developed the eXtensible Flight System, XFS, a cross-platform avionics architecture. XFS has already been integrated in the Zenith CH750 STOL aircraft in the form of both a three-screen panel and the "Unpanel," a portrait-orientation (also landscape) screen to replace the entire traditional glass cockpit.

References

External links
Mark Spencer's previous homepage (copies at the Internet Archive)
Interview with Mark Spencer at OSDir.com
 at CNet
Linux Link Tech Show interview (audio), 2005
 Global open source enthusiasts interview Mark Spencer December 2009
News story regarding changing roles at Digium

1977 births
Living people
People from Huntsville, Alabama
Free software programmers
Auburn High School (Alabama) alumni
Auburn University alumni
Asterisk (PBX)